Rosemarie Rung is a New Hampshire politician.

Education
Rung earned a BS in biochemistry.

Career
On November 6, 2018, Rung was elected to the New Hampshire House of Representatives where she represents the Hillsborough 21 district. She assumed office on December 5, 2018. She is a Democrat.

Personal life
Rung resides in Merrimack, New Hampshire. Rung is married and has three children.

References

Living people
People from Merrimack, New Hampshire
Women state legislators in New Hampshire
Democratic Party members of the New Hampshire House of Representatives
21st-century American politicians
21st-century American women politicians
Year of birth missing (living people)